Thomas Oliver Grant is a former Scotland international rugby union player.

Rugby Union career

Amateur career

He played for Hawick.

Provincial career

He played for the Scottish Border XV in their match against Royal Air Force Rugby Union in 1962.

He played for South of Scotland.

He played for Provinces District - the combined north–south side - in their match against Canada on 28 November 1962.

He played for Blues Trial in the 3rd and last trial match of the 1962-63 season; the Blues edging a 23–20 win over Whites Trial.

International career

He was capped for  six times between 1960 and 1964.

Family

His brother Derrick Grant was also capped for Scotland.

References

Sources

 Bath, Richard (ed.) The Scotland Rugby Miscellany (Vision Sports Publishing Ltd, 2007 )

1933 births
Hawick RFC players
Living people
Scotland international rugby union players
Scottish rugby union players
South of Scotland District (rugby union) players
Provinces District (rugby union) players
Blues Trial players
Rugby union number eights